Bhatgaon is a Census town and Nagar Panchayat in Surajpur district in the Indian state of Chhattisgarh. Bhatgaon is famous for its South Eastern Coalfields Limited, (Bhatgaon Colliery). The current M.L.A of this area is Paras Nath Rajwade. Who is elected from Bhatgaon (Vidhan Sabha constituency).

As of Swachh Survekshan 2020 Zonal Ranking (cities up to 25 K) - East Zone. Nagar Panchayat Bhatgaon is in 13th position.

Demographics And Education
The Bhatgaon town is divided into 15 wards for which elections are held every five years. The Bhatgaon Nagar Panchayat has population of 11,204 of which 5,792 are males while 5,412 are females as per report released by Census India 2011.
Population of Children with age of 0-6 is 1423 which is 12.70 % of total population of Bhatgaon (NP). In Bhatgaon Nagar Panchayat, Female Sex Ratio is of 934 against state average of 991. Moreover Child Sex Ratio in Bhatgaon is around 1024 compared to Chhattisgarh state average of 969. Literacy rate of Bhatgaon town is 78.91 % higher than state average of 70.28 %. In Bhatgaon, Male literacy is around 85.62 % while female literacy rate is 71.63 %.

Bhatgaon Nagar Panchayat has total administration over 2,403 houses to which it supplies basic amenities like water and sewerage. It is also authorize to build roads within Nagar Panchayat limits and impose taxes on properties coming under its jurisdiction.

Bhatgaon has both government and private schools, using both Hindi and English as teaching languages.

 Saraswati Sishu Mandir
 Government Boys Higher Secondary School
 D.A.V Public School
 St. Charles HS School 
 Government Girls Higher Secondary School
 City Public School 
 Shalom Mission School
 A.D Jubilee Memorial School

References

Cities and towns in Surajpur district